Black Ven is a cliff in Dorset, England between the towns of Charmouth and Lyme Regis. It is part of the Jurassic Coast World Heritage Site. Nearby is an undercliff with an ammonite pavement. The area is popular with tourists due to a number of fossils being found in the area.

History 

The Black Ven has been historically renowned for paleontology. Mary Anning found an ichthyosaurus in The Spittles, and James Harrison found the first fossil remains of a Scelidosaurus while quarrying Black Ven in 1858. In 2001, the Black Ven and the whole of Lyme Bay became part of the Jurassic Coast World Heritage Site.

Geology 

Black Ven has the largest mudslides in Europe, and this constantly brings new material (such as fossils) to the base of the cliff and beach. The reason for this is the types of stone found through the cliff. There is porous limestone, which lets the water on rough days flow through it, below which you will find clay, which lets water in, but not out. When the clay becomes saturated, it becomes very slippery and the limestone above can slide off in large chunks. Black Ven for this reason is a famous fossil hunting location, although the mudslides can be surprisingly damaging to the fossils, especially to soft parts such as scales. The Black Ven has a layer called Blue Lias where famous fossilised fish are known to be found. The geological dating of the rocks of the whole of the area (Lyme Bay) is Jurassic. The Black Ven and the Spittles contain rocks from the lower (early) Jurassic. Ammonites, Belemnites, and the occasional Devil's toenail are common finds in this area.

References 
Clarke, Nigel J. (2004) Lyme Bay Fossils: Jurassic Beach Guide. Nigel J. Clarke Publications.

External links 
Charmouth's tourist industry
British Geological Survey: Landslide at Lyme Regis
Black Ven: Love Lyme Regis

See also 
Geology of Dorset

Geology of Dorset
Jurassic Coast
Cliffs of England